MacDonnell Road is an intermediate station on the Peak Tram. It is located on MacDonnell Road, in Mid-Levels, Hong Kong, 95 metres above sea level.

The station comprises a single platform on the western side of the single track. MacDonnell Road passes over the tramway at the downhill end of the station on a stone arch bridge, with the Magazine Gap Road overpass at the uphill end.

The station is a request stop at which tram cars will stop only if passengers have pressed the request button inside the tramcar or at the station. No ticketing equipment is provided on the platform.

References

External links
 

Peak Tram stations